Vesa Rantanen (born 2 December 1975 in Jalasjärvi) is a retired Finnish pole vaulter.

He competed at the World Championships in 1997 and 1999, the 2002 European Championships and the 2004 Olympic Games without ever reaching the final.

His personal best vault is 5.72 metres, achieved in July 2001 in Hamburg. The Finnish record currently belongs to Jani Lehtonen with 5.82 metres.

Competition record

References

1975 births
Living people
People from Jalasjärvi
Finnish male pole vaulters
Athletes (track and field) at the 2004 Summer Olympics
Olympic athletes of Finland
Sportspeople from South Ostrobothnia